Czesław Kwieciński (born 20 January 1943 in Romaškai, Lithuania) is a Polish wrestler who competed from 1964 to 1980 in the Summer Olympics.

Bronze medalist at the 1972 Summer Olympics and 1976 Summer Olympics in wrestling in 90 kg category (light-heavyweight).

He married Ewa Gryziecka, a world record breaker in the javelin throw, and they had three children, settling in Gliwice.

References 

1943 births
Living people
People from Kaunas District Municipality
Polish male sport wrestlers
Olympic wrestlers of Poland
Olympic bronze medalists for Poland
Olympic medalists in wrestling
Wrestlers at the 1964 Summer Olympics
Wrestlers at the 1968 Summer Olympics
Wrestlers at the 1972 Summer Olympics
Wrestlers at the 1976 Summer Olympics
Wrestlers at the 1980 Summer Olympics
Medalists at the 1976 Summer Olympics
Medalists at the 1972 Summer Olympics
20th-century Polish people
21st-century Polish people